The AFC U-17 Women's Asian Cup, founded as the AFC U-17 Women's Championship and later the AFC U-16 Women's Championship, before changing to its current name after the 2019 edition, is a biennial women's football tournament for youth teams organised by the Asian Football Confederation. It further serves as the qualifying competition for the FIFA U-17 Women's World Cup. The AFC have agreed to the proposal for switching the tournament from under-16 to under-17 starting from 2022. Moreover, the tournament will also be rebranded from the "AFC U-16 Women's Championship" to the "AFC U-17 Women's Asian Cup".

The tournament was first held in 2005 as an Under-17 edition. With only eleven teams entering in the inaugural year, there was no qualification held. In 2007 the tournament switched to the Under-16 modus, again eight teams entered the competition. In 2009 twelve teams entered and thus for a first time a qualifying round was held. The 2011 edition featured two qualification rounds. Here five seeded teams for the finals were joined by an additional 13 teams fighting for a final sixth spot.

Results

Teams reaching the top four

Medal summary

Awards

Summary (2005-2019)

Summary results 
Legend
 – Champions
 – Runners-up
 – Third place
 – Fourth place
QF – Quarterfinals
GS – Group stage
 – Did not qualify 
 – Did not enter / Withdrew
 – Country did not exist or national team was inactive
 – Hosts
q – Qualified for upcoming tournament

For each tournament, the flag of the host country and the number of teams in each finals tournament (in brackets) are shown.

See also
AFC U-20 Women's Asian Cup
AFC U-17 Asian Cup

References

External links

 at RSSSF.com

 
Under-16 association football
Asian Football Confederation competitions for women's national teams
Youth football competitions
Recurring sporting events established in 2005